Buncha Hair That Long is a live performance album by Borbetomagus, released in 1992 by Agaric Records.

Track listing

Personnel 
Adapted from Buncha Hair That Long liner notes.

Borbetomagus
 Don Dietrich – saxophone
 Donald Miller – electric guitar
 Jim Sauter – saxophone

Production and additional personnel
 Bruce Hanke – cover art

Release history

References

External links 
 Buncha Hair That Long at Discogs (list of releases)

1991 live albums
Borbetomagus albums